Bolshoy Priklon is a rural locality (a village) in Danilovskoye Rural Settlement, Melenkovsky District, Vladimir Oblast, Russia. The population was 405 as of 2010. There are 3 streets.

Geography 
Bolshoy Priklon is located 5 km northwest of Melenki (the district's administrative centre) by road. Priklon is the nearest rural locality.

References 

Rural localities in Melenkovsky District